Pero catalina is a species of geometrid moth in the family Geometridae. It is found in North America.

The MONA or Hodges number for Pero catalina is 6762.2.

References

Further reading

 

Azelinini
Articles created by Qbugbot
Moths described in 1987